Jānis Iesalnieks is a Latvian politician, former Parliamentary Secretary of Minister of Justice, and currently is Member of the 13th Saeima.

Controversy 

After the 2011 Norway attacks, he tweeted "The Norwegian victims are entirely on the conscience of multiculturalists - their islamization policy led to someone simply going crazy". The same day Iesalnieks issued a statement where he denied justifying the actions of Anders Breivik, but later announced he would be stepping down as the party's board member and not running for the 2011 Latvian parliamentary election.

References

Deputies of the 13th Saeima
National Alliance (Latvia) politicians
Living people
University of Latvia alumni
1984 births